Cladius is a genus of common sawflies in the family Tenthredinidae. There are about 17 described species in Cladius.

Species
These 17 species belong to the genus Cladius:

 Cladius aeneus Zaddach, 1859 g
 Cladius brullei (Dahlbom, 1835) g
 Cladius comari Stein, 1886 g
 Cladius compressicornis (Fabricius, 1804) g
 Cladius difformis (Panzer) i c g b (bristly rose slug)
 Cladius foveivaginatus (Malaise, 1931) g
 Cladius grandis (Serville, 1823) g
 Cladius hyalopterus (Jakovlev, 1891) g
 Cladius nigricans Cameron, 1902 g
 Cladius nubilus (Konow, 1897) g
 Cladius ordubadensis Konow, 1892 g
 Cladius pallipes Serville, 1823 g
 Cladius palmicornis Konow, 1892 g
 Cladius pectinicornis (Geoffroy, 1785) g
 Cladius pilicornis (Curtis, 1833) g
 Cladius rufipes (Serville, 1823) g
 Cladius ulmi (Linnaeus, 1758) g

Data sources: i = ITIS, c = Catalogue of Life, g = GBIF, b = Bugguide.net

References

External links

 

Tenthredinidae
Articles created by Qbugbot